Tube Time is a now-defunct programming block on Comcast Digital Cable's On Demand service which featured free episodes of many classic television series owned by Sony Pictures Television.

On December 31, 2009, Tube Time was discontinued by Comcast, due to the Xfinity upgrade.

Programs Offered on Tube Time
Barney Miller
Bewitched
Carson's Comedy Classics
Charlie's Angels
Diff'rent Strokes
The Facts of Life
Fantasy Island
Gidget
I Dream of Jeannie
The Larry Sanders Show
Maude
The Monkees
Ned & Stacey
One Day at a Time
The Partridge Family
Party of Five
Sanford and Son
Silver Spoons
Soap
Square Pegs
Starsky & Hutch
S.W.A.T.
The Three Stooges
What's Happening!!
Who's the Boss?

References

Television programming blocks in the United States